Vingtaine du Rocquier (Jèrriais: Vîngtaine du Rotchi) is one of the three vingtaines of the Parish of Saint Clement in Jersey. Rotchi means rock or rocky place in Jèrriais, and the vingtaine covers generally low-lying coastal terrain stretching north from Le Hocq and rising up hillsides. Within the vingtaine are Saint Clement's school (primary) and Le Rocquier School.

See also
Vingtaine de Samarès
Grande Vingtaine

References

Rocquier
Saint Clement, Jersey